William Herbert (1621–1646) was an English politician who sat in the House of Commons  from 1640 to 1644. He supported the Royalist cause in the English Civil War

Herbert was the fifth son of Philip Herbert, 4th Earl of Pembroke, and his wife Susan de Vere, daughter of the 17th earl of Oxford. He matriculated at Exeter College, Oxford, on 29 January 1635 aged 13 and was awarded MA on 31 August 1636.

In November 1640, Herbert was elected Member of Parliament for Monmouthshire and Woodstock in the Long Parliament, and chose to sit for Monmouthshire. He supported the King and was disabled from sitting on 5 February 1644.

Herbert died unmarried at the age of 25.

References

 

1621 births
1646 deaths
English MPs 1640–1648
Alumni of Exeter College, Oxford
Cavaliers
People from Wiltshire
People from Monmouthshire